The Sir Leonard Tilley Building and Annex, is a Government of Canada office building property consisting of two buildings and operated by the Public Works and Government Services Canada and located at 719 Heron Road in Ottawa, Ontario, Canada. It was designed by Bemi & Associates Architects. The floor space covers 23,832 square metres and the land area covers 4.527 hectares. Until 2015, the building housed the headquarters of the Communications Security Establishment (CSE). This building was named in honour of Samuel Leonard Tilley, federal Finance Minister in 1873–1878.

The completion of a new headquarters building on Ogilvie Road led the CSE to vacate the building by 2016. Public Works Canada is preparing the buildings to allow other government departments to take their place. The Department of National Defence determined the facilities did not meet their needs but Corrections Canada, the Canada Revenue Agency and the Canada Border Services Agency were indicated as possible future tenants. The entry of new tenants is planned to be phased in over 2018–9. The cost of refurbishing the buildings to meet new standards, or Workplace 2.0, will cost about $400 million.

References

External links
Treasury Board of Canada Inventory - Sir Leonard Tilley Building and Annex
 The Government of Canada Workplace 2.0 Fit-up Standards

Federal government buildings in Ottawa
Government buildings completed in 1961
Communications Security Establishment buildings and structures
Intelligence agency headquarters
Modernist architecture in Canada
Office buildings in Canada
1961 establishments in Ontario